Ectoedemia grandisella is a moth of the family Nepticulidae. It is found in Texas, United States.

External links
Nepticulidae of North America

Nepticulidae
Moths of North America
Moths described in 1878